, abbreviated as , is a Japanese adult visual novel developed by Sprite, which was released in Japan on October 29, 2010 for Windows PCs and later ported to the PlayStation Portable on September 27, 2012. The gameplay in Love, Election and Chocolate follows a branching plot line, which offers pre-determined scenarios with courses of interaction, and focuses on the appeal of the five female main characters by the player character. There have been two manga adaptations serialized in ASCII Media Works' Dengeki G's Magazine and  Dengeki Daioh. A 12-episode anime television series adaptation produced by AIC Build and directed by Tōru Kitahata aired between July and September 2012, with an additional episode released on the series' final Blu-ray Disc and DVD volume in March 2013.

Gameplay

Love, Election and Chocolate is a romance visual novel in which the player assumes the role of Yuki Ojima. Its gameplay requires little player interaction as much of the game's duration is spent on reading the text that appears on the screen, which represents the story's narrative and dialogue. Love, Election and Chocolate follows a branching plot line with multiple endings, and depending on the decisions that the player makes during the game, the plot will progress in a specific direction.

There are five main plot lines that the player will have the chance to experience, one for each of the heroines in the story. Every so often, the player will come to a point where they are given the chance to choose from multiple options. Text progression pauses at these points until a choice is made. To view all plot lines in their entirety, the player will have to replay the game multiple times and choose different choices to further the plot to an alternate direction. In the adult versions of the game, there are scenes with sexual CGs depicting Yuki and a given heroine having sex.

Plot
Love, Election and Chocolate follows the protagonist Yūki Ōjima, who attends , a large school with over 6,000 students. The members leisurely spend their time in the club not doing much activities. When the election of the next student council president comes up, the front runner Satsuki Shinonome proposes that clubs that have no merit should be sorted out and abolished. The Food Research Club seeks advice from the current student council president Yakumo Mōri, who suggests Yūki run in the election as an opposing candidate. Yūki learns about the issues facing the school and decides to run in the election.

Characters

Main characters

 (anime), Yuka Keicho (child)
Yūki is the protagonist of Love, Election and Chocolate and is a second-year student at Takafuji Academy, who lives in an apartment with his mother. His father died when he was a child. He is a member of FRC. He is mostly annoyed when someone reads his last name wrong—Ōshima, and not Ōjima. In the anime, he learns his feelings for Chisato and later becomes her boyfriend.

 (PC game), Eriko Nakamura (PSP game/anime), Hiro Nakajima (child)
Chisato is a second-year student at Takafuji Academy and is Yūki's childhood best friend. She is the president of FRC. She does not like chocolate due to the death of her younger brother, who was fond of chocolate. She later becomes Yuki's girlfriend in the anime, after she realizes her feelings for him and is able to come in terms with her younger brother's death and no longer dislikes chocolate and begins eating them with Yuki.

 (PC game), Mai Kadowaki (PSP game/anime)
Isara is a first-year student. She lives with her mother and two younger brothers. She works at a fast food restaurant because her family is poor, and is bullied by the wealthier students constantly, both physically and verbally.

Michiru is a first-year student and Isara's classmate. She is a newcomer who joined FRC just before the student council election. She lives in the student dormitory because her home is far from Takafuji Academy. She is generally very quiet, only speaking a few words to express her thoughts, and almost never smiles. She knows how to play one song on a harmonica her best friend Kana taught her, and came to Takafuji Academy to look for her. She has the ability to see what mood a person is in, ranging from blue (sad), yellow (happy), to purple/black (evil).

 (PC game), Kaori Mizuhashi (PSP game/anime)
Mifuyu is a second-year student. She is Yūki's classmate and is a member of FRC. She is actually one year older than Yuki since she had to repeat the same class due to an illness before she saw Yūki for the first time. She is from Hokkaido. Yūki, Chisato and Mifuyu go to school together on foot every morning. A running gag involves Yuki asking Mifuya out, but always turning him down by saying she already found someone special, much to his chagrin, but it is later revealed she is in love with Yuki. However, she holds back from admitting her feelings due to not wanting to risk her friendship with Chisato, wanting her to be happy and she supports her and Yuki being together.

 (PC game), Yū Asakawa (PSP game/anime)
Satsuki is a second-year student. She is in the student council and is the head of the financial affairs department. She is a wise girl and is a strong candidate in the next student council president election. Her family manages a wagashi shop. She goes to school by bicycle. She has a crush on Ōjima and tends to give him made up names. She and Hazuki have a strained relationship because of family issues, but she later understands her after learning the truth about Hazuki's birth.

Supporting characters

 (PC game), Yuko Gibu (PSP game/anime)
Nozomi is a third-year student and is the former president of FRC. She is younger than Yūki because she had skipped several grades abroad and returned to Japan. She is a genius girl at science and is good at making various inventions. She is a main character in the PSP game.

 (PC game/PSP game/anime)
Oboro is a first-year student and is the vice-president of FRC. His parent manages a large confectionery company named Umachin. He tends to sexually harass Yūki, much to his annoyance.

 (PC game), Yuka Inokuchi (PSP game/anime)
Ai is a second-year student and a member of FRC. She wears a hair ornament shaped like a carrot. Her family runs a fruit and vegetable store. Kii Monzennaka is her childhood friend.

 (PC game), Ayumi Fujimura (PSP game/anime)
Kii is a second-year student and a member of FRC. She wears a hair ornament shaped like a fish. Her family runs a fish shop. Ai Sarue is her childhood friend.

 (PC game), Chiemi Ishimatsu (PSP game/anime)
Hazuki is a 23-year-old teacher at Takafuji Academy. She is Satsuki's older sister and is the adviser for FRC. She often drinks beer in the clubroom of FRC. She secretly loves Yuki. She initially believed she was the daughter of her father's first wife, but she later discovers that she is in fact the illegitimate daughter of her father's then-mistress. Her father's first wife later dies and he marries his mistress, who later gives birth to Satsuki. Upon realizing this, Hazuki became depressed and left the family.

 (PC game), Asami Sanada (PSP game/anime)
Hidaka is a second-year student. Hidaka's gender is unknown as Hidaka is seen wearing both the male and female school uniforms. Hidaka is a reporter in ASP (Anti Suppression Paper), which is one of the news clubs at Takafuji Academy. It is later revealed that Hidaka is a girl.

 (PC game/PSP game/anime)
Mieru is a second-year student and is Yuki's classmate.

 (PC game), Kōji Yusa (PSP game/anime)
Reiji is a second-year student and is Yuki's classmate. There is a propeller on the top of his head.

 (PC game), Takahiro Mizushima (PSP game/anime)
Moheiji is a second-year student. He is in the student council and is the head of the general affairs department. He also is a candidate in the next student council president election. He always wears an odd, henohenomoheji-like mask.

 (PC game), Ken'ichi Suzumura (PSP game/anime)
Yakumo is a third-year student and is the student council president at the start of Koichoco. He ran for the presidency on the previous student council election as the head of the Security Affairs department. He is very gentlemanly, but his approval rating has fallen to under 30% due to a scandal called the Ōsawa incident.

 (PC game), Yuka Iguchi (anime)
Kana is Yakumo's friend. She was hit-and-run by someone's car and became unconscious.

 (anime)
Ōsawa is a student that is part of the Katahira Faction and the newly appointed Security Affairs Commissioner. She is the main antagonist of the series.

Guest characters
Guest characters from Ima Sugu Oniichan ni Imouto da tte Iitai!

 (anime)

 (anime)

 (anime)

 (anime)

Development and release
In November 2009, Sprite was established as a sister brand of the visual novel developing brand Selen. Love, Election and Chocolate is Sprite's debut title. The game's producer was Akira Sakamoto. The scenario was written by Kō Katagi, while art direction and character design was done by Yū Akinashi. The background music was produced by members of Elements Garden, who also produced the theme music with I've Sound. Love, Election and Chocolate was released on October 29, 2010 as a limited edition version, playable on a Windows PC. A regular edition was released on November 19, 2010. Sprite released a special edition version of the game on December 29, 2011 to commemorate the anime adaptation, which included an art book and a single from I've Sound. A version playable on the PlayStation Portable (PSP) titled  was released on September 27, 2012 by Kadokawa Games.

Adaptations

Printed media
A manga adaptation, illustrated by Tōko Kanno and titled , was serialized in ASCII Media Works' Dengeki G's Magazine between the February 2011 and April 2014 issues. Six tankōbon volumes were released between July 27, 2011 and May 27, 2014. A second manga, illustrated by Waki Ikawa and titled , was serialized in ASCII Media Works' Dengeki Daioh between the May 2011 and January 2014 issues. Six volumes for SLC were released between September 27, 2011 and January 27, 2014. Two volumes of a manga anthology titled Love, Elections & Chocolate Comic Anthology were released by Ichijinsha between April and July 2011.

A light novel adaptation titled , written by Yasuaki Mikami and illustrated by AIC and Naoto Ayano, was published on August 21, 2012 by Shogakukan.

Internet radio shows
An Internet radio show to promote the game titled  broadcast 18 episodes between December 10, 2010 and August 5, 2011. The show was produced by Lantis and was hosted by Megumi Ogata who voices Oboro Yumeshima in Love, Election and Chocolate. The show was revived with the title  to promote the anime and had a pre-broadcast on April 13, 2012. The show began regular weekly broadcasting on April 27, 2012 and is produced by the Japanese Internet radio station Hibiki; Ogata is retained as the show's host.

Anime
A 12-episode anime television series, directed by Tōru Kitahata and produced by AIC Build and Aniplex, aired between July 6 and September 28, 2012 on TBS and BS-TBS. The screenplay was written by Katsuhiko Takayama, and chief animator Hiroaki Gōda based the character design used in the anime on's Yū Akinashi original designs. The anime's music is produced by Elements Garden. The anime was released in seven Blu-ray Disc (BD) and DVD compilation volumes between September 26, 2012 and March 27, 2013. The final BD and DVD volume contained an original video animation episode. Sentai Filmworks has licensed the anime for home video release, and Anime Network streamed the series on their website.<ref>{{cite web|url=http://www.animenewsnetwork.com/news/2012-08-29/sentai-filmworks-adds-love-elections-and-chocolate-anime|title=Sentai Filmworks Adds Love, Elections, & Chocolate Anime|publisher=Anime News Network|date=August 29, 2012|access-date=August 29, 2012}}</ref> The English-language Blu-ray and DVD were released on February 25, 2014.

MusicLove, Election and Chocolate has eight pieces of theme music: one opening theme, one insert song, and six ending themes. The opening theme is "Initiative" by Mami Kawada of I've Sound. The insert song is "Piece of My Heart" by Nami Maisaki of I've Sound. Each heroine has her own ending theme, starting with Chisato's theme "A Little Love Song" by Eriko Nakamura. The main ending theme is "Jewelry Time" by Ceui. An album containing the ending themes titled Chocolate Songs was released on April 27, 2011 by Lantis. The game's original soundtrack was released on May 27, 2011 by Sprite. The opening theme for the PSP version is "Step Ahead" by Annabel.

The single for "Signal Graph" was released on July 25, 2012, and the single for "Kaze no Naka no Primrose" was released on August 8, 2012. The insert song  by Annabel is used in episode one.

Reception
From June to October 2010, Love, Election and Chocolate ranked three times in the top ten in national PC game pre-orders in Japan. The rankings were at No. 9 from June to August, No. 6 from August to September, and No. 3 from September to October. The game ranked four times in the top 50 in terms of national sales of PC games in Japan. The rankings were at No. 1 for October 2010, No. 19 for November 2010, No. 33 for December 2010, and No. 48 for January 2011. The Windows version released to commemorate the anime adaptation ranked at No. 33 in terms of sales in December 2011. The game was the fifth best-selling title on Getchu.com, a major redistributor of visual novel and domestic anime products, for the year of 2010.

In Getchu.com's 2010 game ranking, Love, Election and Chocolate placed 4th in Graphics, 8th in Scenario, 8th in Music, 11th in Movie, and 6th overall. Satsuki Shinonome was voted the 14th best character from games released that year. The PSP version of Love, Election and Chocolate sold 16,743 copies in the week it was released, making it the seventh best selling non-PC game in Japan that week.

See alsoAo no Kanata no Four Rhythm''

References

External links
 
Love, Election and Chocolate Portable at ASCII Media Works 
Anime official website 

2010 video games
2011 manga
2012 anime television series debuts
Anime television series based on video games
Anime International Company
ASCII Media Works manga
Bishōjo games
Dengeki Daioh
Dengeki G's Magazine
Drama anime and manga
Eroge
Harem anime and manga
Gagaga Bunko
Japan-exclusive video games
Kadokawa Dwango franchises
Manga based on video games
PlayStation Portable games
Romance anime and manga
Romance video games
Seinen manga
Sentai Filmworks
Shōnen manga
Video games developed in Japan
Visual novels
Windows games
Works about elections